London is an unincorporated community in London Township, Freeborn County, Minnesota, United States. It is along County Road 34, 903rd Avenue near 120th Street.

History
London was platted in 1900. The community was named after New London, Connecticut. The London post office closed in 1996.

References

Unincorporated communities in Freeborn County, Minnesota
Unincorporated communities in Minnesota